Bosminidae is a family of anomopods in the order Diplostraca. There are at least 3 genera and 40 described species in Bosminidae.

Genera
 Bosmina Baird, 1845
 Bosminopsis Richard, 1895
 Eubosmina Seligo, 1900

References

Further reading

 
 
 
 

Cladocera
Crustacean families